Wang Lei (born January 25, 1981) is a Chinese sprint canoer who competed in the mid-2000s. At the 2004 Summer Olympics in Athens, he was eliminated in the semifinals of the K-2 500 m event while being disqualified in the semifinals of the K-2 1000 m event.

References

Sports-Reference.com profile

1981 births
Canoeists at the 2004 Summer Olympics
Living people
Olympic canoeists of China
Asian Games medalists in canoeing
Canoeists from Shandong
People from Liaocheng
Canoeists at the 2010 Asian Games
Chinese male canoeists
Medalists at the 2010 Asian Games
Asian Games bronze medalists for China